Peter Read is an Australian Olympic boxer.

Peter Read may alsorefer to:
Peter Read (historian), professor at the Australian National University, the first to use the phrase "stolen generation"
Peter Read, music magazine publisher, see music of Arkansas

See also
Peter Reade (born 1939), British former sailor
Peter Reed (disambiguation)
Peter Reid (disambiguation)